The third season of the American television drama series Falling Skies was renewed on July 11, 2012 for a total of 10 episodes. The season premiered on June 9 and ended on August 4, 2013. On July 2, 2013, TNT renewed the show for a fourth season.

Cast and characters

Main
 Noah Wyle as Tom Mason
 Moon Bloodgood as Anne Glass
 Drew Roy as Hal Mason
 Connor Jessup as Ben Mason
 Maxim Knight as Matt Mason
 Seychelle Gabriel as Lourdes
 Mpho Koaho as Anthony
 Sarah Sanguin Carter as Maggie
 Colin Cunningham as John Pope
 Doug Jones as Cochise
 Will Patton as Dan Weaver

Recurring
 Jessy Schram as Karen Nadler
 Gloria Reuben as Marina Peralta
 Dale Dye as Jim Porter
 Robert Sean Leonard as Roger Kadar
 Laci J. Mailey as Jeanne Weaver
 Megan Danso as Deni
 Matt Frewer as Cole Bressler
 Luciana Carro as Crazy Lee
 Ryan Robbins as Tector
 Brad Kelly as Lyle
 Luvia Petersen as Catherine Fisher
 Stephen Collins as Benjamin Hathaway
 Jared Keeso as Lars

Special Guest
 Peter Shinkoda as Dai (1 episode)

Episodes

Production

Development
On July 11, 2012, the series was renewed for a third season, consisting of 10 episodes and premiered on June 9, 2013. Writer and co-executive producer Mark Verheiden disclosed that he would not return to the series for the third season.

Casting
On August 23, 2012, it was reported that House veteran Robert Sean Leonard and E.R. actress Gloria Reuben had joined the season's recurring cast as Roger Kadar and Marina Peralta, respectively. Actress Jessy Schram recurred as Karen Nadler during the season. Hellboy'''s Doug Jones portrayed the new alien introduced at the end of the season two finale, "A More Perfect Union". 7th Heaven'' veteran Stephen Collins portrayed Benjamin Hathaway, the current President of the United States, in the season's fourth and seventh episode.

Filming
Principal photography for the season began on August 22, 2012 and concluded December 21, 2012, in Vancouver, British Columbia.

Reception

Ratings

References

External links
 

 
 
2013 American television seasons